Seven Layer Piano Cakes is an American music project based in Pasadena, California. The project was launched in 2020 by Justin Hoyt, a producer, songwriter, multi-instrumentalist, lawyer, and law professor at the USC Gould School of Law. Seven Layer Piano Cakes released its debut EP "Mood Swings" in 2020, a follow-up EP "The Patriarch" in 2021, and numerous singles including "Middlegame" and "Remy," all to widespread critical acclaim.

Seven Layer Piano Cakes' music is mastered by Greg Calbi and Steve Fallone of Sterling Sound.

Overview
Seven Layer Piano Cakes is the melodic alter ego of Justin Hoyt, who is a Los Angeles attorney and professor of law. The solo singer of the band is a classically educated pianist and vocalist who is motivated to write, perform, and make music that pays homage to the complexity and sounds of previous eras while adding a contemporary twist.

History
Justin Hoyt is originally from San Dimas, California, and a San Dimas High School graduate. Hoyt later earned a bachelor's degree from San Diego State University and law degrees from Brooklyn Law School and the USC Gould School of Law. The origins for the project came while Hoyt was living in New York City and experimenting in combining classical music foundations with modern dream pop and new wave musicality.

In 2017, Hoyt moved back to the Pasadena, California area and launched Seven Layer Piano Cakes in mid-2020. Seven Layer Piano Cakes' self-produced debut EP "Mood Swings," a collection of four piano/vocals songs released in October 2020. A second EP, "The Patriarch," featuring three full productions co-produced by Hope Brush and Ian Stahl, was released in early 2021 to enthusiastic critical acclaim. The singles "Middlegame" and "Remy" followed and were released in April 2021 and February 2022, respectively. All of Seven Layer Piano Cakes' songs have been mastered by Greg Calbi and Steve Fallone of Sterling Sound.

A single, "Endgame," was released on April 1, 2022, and features the artist VRL as co-vocalist.

Two singles called "Gumdrops" and "Nebula Eyes" were released later in 2022.  Obscure Sound described "Gumdrops" as a "melodic charmer" with "caressing synth tones and harmonious vocals."

The project is currently in production on a single scheduled for release in late 2022 or early 2023 called "Holy Water" featuring Ruby Friedman.

Musical style and influences
Seven Layer Piano Cakes has showcased dream pop, indietronica, synthwave, alternative rock, pop-rock, melodic metalcore, and Western classical music. Seven Layer Piano Cakes' music has been compared to artists such as Beach House, The Beach Boys, Sufjan Stevens, M83, Thrice, Elliott Smith, The Strokes, Grandaddy, Queen, and Elton John. Hoyt has acknowledged such comparisons but has been reluctant to pin a singular label or genre on his influences and musical style.

Discography
Discography:

Studio EPs
Mood Swings (2020)
The Patriarch (2021)
Instrumentals and a Mellow One (2021)

Singles
"Middlegame" (2021)
"Remy" (2022)
"Endgame" (2022)

Personal life
Beyond music, Justin Hoyt is an attorney and adjunct law professor at the USC Gould School of Law, where he practices and teaches in the arbitration, mediation, and alternative dispute resolution fields. Although a practicing attorney since 2011, Hoyt briefly attended the Juilliard School's Evening Division at various times between 2009 and 2015. He currently resides in Pasadena, California.

References

External links
Spotify

American new wave musical groups
American pop rock music groups